Anjeza Rexhepi (born 8 August 2001) is a Kosovan footballer who plays as a midfielder for Women's League club KFF A&N and the Kosovo women's national team.

See also
List of Kosovo women's international footballers

References

2001 births
Living people
Kosovan women's footballers
Women's association football midfielders
Kosovo women's international footballers
KFF A&N players